The Dallach D.2 Sunrise, also known as the WDFL Sunrise after its suppliers, is a single-engine, single-seat cantilever monoplane.  It was designed and marketed as a homebuilt aircraft in Germany by Wolfgang Dallach.

Design and development

Wolfgang Dallach's Sunrise, marketed ready-to-fly or in kit form by his WD Flugzeug Leichtbau (WDFL), was his first ultralight design. In Germany, it was the first ultralight equipped with a four-stroke engine. The Sunrise is a tandem two-seater. Both seats are equipped with a throttle lever, rudder and control stick. Full engine control is available only from the rear seat. The fuselage is built from steel tubes and is fabric covered. The wing has a nose made of fiberglass. The main spar is built from CFK.  The Sunrise has a fixed tailwheel undercarriage, with the mainwheels hinged from the fuselage on V-form, cross-connected struts.  Some Sunrises have wheel fairings.

The Sunrise can be powered by one of several engines in the 28-66 kW (38-90 hp) power range.

Operational history

About 39 Sunrises are thought to have been built, all flying in Germany. In mid-2010, 19 years after kit production ended, 38 still appeared on the German civil register.

Variants
Data from DAec
SunriseOriginal version, 28 kW (37.5 hp) Citroën KKHD four-stroke engine
Sunrise IIA 47 kW (74.6 hp) Sauer UL 2100 two-stroke engine
Sunrise IIB 66 kW (88.5 hp) BMW UL four-stroke engine
Sunrise IIC 51 kW (68 hp) BMW R1000 four-stroke engine
Sunrise (Verner) 59 kW (79 hp) Verner SVS 1400 engine

Specifications (Citroën KKHD engine)

References

External links 

  Sunrise: D-MFWD 
 The Prototype, converted as simulator!
 Flyer
 Aerokurier 11-88

1980s German sport aircraft
Low-wing aircraft
Single-engined tractor aircraft
Aircraft first flown in 1986